The Battery Gladden Light was a lighthouse in Mobile Bay which marked a turn in the old ship channel. It was deactivated in 1913 and no longer exists.

History
Battery Gladden was constructed on an artificial island as part of the defenses set up in the Civil War. Dredging operations after the war established a ship channel which ran towards the light and turned to the west just south of the island. In order to direct ships through the channel a square screw-pile house was built in 1872 on the old fortification and equipped with a fourth order Fresnel lens. Channel dredging continued and a new channel was dug to the west, bypassing the portion marked by this light, which was extinguished in 1913. The house remained standing as a daymark, finally succumbing to the elements around 1950.

References 

Lighthouses in Alabama
Lighthouses completed in 1872
1872 establishments in Alabama
Transportation buildings and structures in Mobile County, Alabama